Francesca Pianzola was a Swiss athlete of Italian origin. She competed in the two-handed javelin throw and shot put.

In 1921 she competed at the Women's Olympiad in Monte Carlo winning silver medal in javelin. In 1922 the competed at the Women's Olympiad in Monte Carlo again winning the gold medal in javelin, later in 1922 she also competed at the first regular Women's World Games in Paris again winning gold medal in the javelin event.

In 1923 she again participated in the Women's Olympiad in Monte Carlo winning silver medal in javelin, that year she was ranked fifth in the world in the traditional javelin throw.

References

Date of birth unknown
Date of death unknown
Year of birth unknown
Year of death unknown
Swiss female javelin throwers
Swiss female shot putters
Women's World Games medalists